Chander Moto Bou (English: A Wife Similar To Moon) is a 2009 Bangladeshi film starring Shabnur, Riaz and Nipun. It garnered Bangladesh National Film Awards in 2 categories: Best Dialogue for Mujtaba Saud and Best Supporting Actress for Nipun.

Awards 
Bangladesh National Film Awards
Best Supporting Actress - Nipun
Best Dialogue - Mujtaba Saud

References

2009 films
Bengali-language Bangladeshi films
Films scored by Alam Khan
Films scored by Ahmed Imtiaz Bulbul
Films scored by Ali Akram Shuvo
2000s Bengali-language films